Hazari Lal Chauhan is an Indian politician and a member of the Sixth Legislative Assembly of Delhi in India. He represents the Patel Nagar constituency of New Delhi and is a member of the Aam Aadmi Party political party.

Early life and  education
Hazari Lal Chauhan was born in Karol Bagh. He attended the  Govt. School, Dev Nagar and is educated till Ninth grade.

Political career
Hazari Lal Chauhan has been a MLA for one term. He represented the Patel Nagar constituency and is a member of the Aam Aadmi Party political party. In 1983, Chauhan had contested the New Delhi Municipal Council elections.

Posts held

See also

Aam Aadmi Party
Delhi Legislative Assembly
Patel Nagar (Delhi Assembly constituency)
Politics of India
Sixth Legislative Assembly of Delhi

References 

1948 births
Aam Aadmi Party politicians from Delhi
Delhi MLAs 2015–2020
Living people
People from New Delhi